Vinit Kakar is an Indian film and television  actor.

Playing the lead role of U Tirot sing in Swaraj.

He was seen as contestant in the first season of Lock Upp host Kangana Ranaut.  

Played lead antagonist in Jogan musical album.

Played a cop in kingsman web series.

Played  lead villain in Ziddi Dil Maane Na.

Played Central character of  Mayasur in Zee Studios show Baal Shiv.

Played the  central character in sikhya entertainment's web crime series Kaun.

Played three different roles of Shishupal, Takshak and Rahu in TV  series Radhakrishn.

Played the dual character of Rakhtbeej and Daruk in TV series Devi adi Parashakti.

Played the character of Meghnad "Indrajeet" in TV series Ram siya ke Luv kush.

Played the central character Aryan in the upcoming web series Title Role.

Played the character Prince Kaivarta in Chandragupta Maurya.

Played dual character of Gajmukhasur and Andhakasur in Vignaharta Ganesh TV series.

Played the character of Mahapaarshav in Sankatmochan Mahabali Hanuman for.

Vinit was earlier seen as a star player of the reality show Truth Love Cash.

and later went on doing an award-winning play One Coin Please

He also played lead antagonist Dreko in Rudra Ke Rakshak and later as Inspector Dabangg in 2015 film, Rahasya.

Played the character of  "Haiwan-ae-Iblees" in Aladdin-Naam Toh Suna Hoga.

References

Living people
Indian male soap opera actors
Male actors from Mumbai
Year of birth missing (living people)